County Road 542 is a  long county road in Vestland county, Norway.  The road is located in Stord Municipality and Bømlo Municipality. It connects the islands of Bømlo to the island of Føyno in Stord via part of the Triangle Link. County Road 542 contains two mayor bridges, the Bømla Bridge and Spissøy Bridge.

History
Before 1 January 2010, the route was a Norwegian national road, known as National Road 542. It was redesignated a county road after the regional reform of national roads.

References

 
542
542
Stord
Bømlo